The 2007 Kraft Nabisco Championship was the 36th Kraft Nabisco Championship, held March 29 to April 1 at Mission Hills Country Club in Rancho Mirage, California, southeast of Palm Springs. This was the 25th edition of the event as a major championship and the total purse was $2 million, with a winner's share of $300,000.

Morgan Pressel shot a bogey-free 69 in the final round to win her only major title, one stroke ahead of runners-up Brittany Lincicome, Catriona Matthew, and 54-hole co-leader Suzann Pettersen. The low amateur was collegian Stacy Lewis, a redshirt junior at Arkansas who carded a final round 70 (−2) and finished two strokes behind, in a four-way tie for fifth.

The 36-hole co-leaders at 140 (−4) were world number two Lorena Ochoa and number five Paula Creamer, with Petterson and first round leader Shi-Hyun Ahn a stroke back; all four were in search of their first major. Ochoa made a quadruple-bogey at 17 on Saturday, and Creamer shot 78 (+6) on Sunday. Top-ranked Annika Sorenstam made the cut, but just barely at 151 (+7).

Pettersen, 25, co-led with Se Ri Pak after the third round at 212 (−4) and had a four-stroke lead with four holes to play on Sunday. Double bogeys at 15 and 16, and a bogey on the par-3 17th dropped Pettersen a stroke back, and she missed a birdie putt on the final hole to force a playoff. She rebounded and gained her first LPGA Tour victory in May at Kingsmill, the next major at the LPGA Championship in June, and three additional victories in 2007.

Pressel's win vaulted her thirteen places in the world rankings, from seventeenth to a career-high fourth.

Past champions in the field

Made the cut

Missed the cut

Source:

Round summaries

First round
Thursday, March 29, 2007

Source:

Second round
Friday, March 30, 2007

Source:

Amateurs: Lewis (E), Choe (+9), Coutu (+9).

Third round
Saturday, March 31, 2007

Source:

Final round
Sunday, April 1, 2007

Source:

Amateurs: Lewis (−1), Coutu (+18), Choe (+19).

Scorecard
Final round

Cumulative tournament scores, relative to par

Source:

References

External links
Golf Observer leaderboard

Chevron Championship
Golf in California
Kraft Nabisco Championship
Kraft Nabisco Championship
Kraft Nabisco Championship
Kraft Nabisco Championship
Kraft Nabisco Championship